Caledothele elegans is a spider species in the genus Caledothele found in New Caledonia.

References

Euagridae
Spiders of New Caledonia
Spiders of Oceania
Spiders described in 1991